The Eloyi Christian Church is a church that originated in a small village in Botswana in 1955, and has since spread across Botswana and into neighboring countries.
The church has attracted much attention for its dramatic séances and exorcisms of demons.

The Eloyi Christian Church  was founded by Jakoba Keiphile in 1955 in the small village of Tsetsebjwe, to the southeast of Selebi Phikwe. 
The church  fights evil spirits and their agents, and heals people.
The church began to expand in 2005 after Jakoba grew old and handed over responsibility to his children. 
As of 2005 the church was based in the north part of Botswana.
In early 2005 church members hunted and dismembered a snake that they said was terrorizing a Tlokweng family.
During the 2005-2007 period the church gained a large amount of media coverage due to the dramatic exorcisms of demons practiced during its services.
In séances the church revives traditional Tswana practices in an Old Testament and new form.

By the end of 2007 the church had between 4,000 and 6,000 members in branches throughout Botswana and in South Africa and it has more than 150 branches currently.
The members were typically low-paid and not highly educated, but holding steady jobs.
The church has its origins in the American revivalist movement of the late nineteenth century.
The church baptises its members with full immersion in Jordan.

The church is the subject of the 56-minute documentary film Encountering Eloyi (2008) directed by Richard Werbner. The film tells of a childless couple who have tried both traditional medicine and Western hospitals without success. The woman turns to the church to be healed of her barrenness.

References
Notes

Citations

Sources

Christian organizations established in 1955
Churches in Botswana
1955 establishments in the British Empire